The Low, later Morrison-Low Baronetcy, of Kilmaron in the County of Fife, is a title in the Baronetage of the United Kingdom. It was created on 27 November 1908 for Sir James Low, Lord Provost of Dundee from 1893 to 1896. He was the son of William Low and his wife Janet, daughter of Alexander Morrison. The second Baronet assumed by deed poll the additional surname of Morrison. As of 2014 the title is held by his grandson, the fourth Baronet, who succeeded his father, in 2012.

Low, later Morrison-Low baronets, of Kilmaron (1908)
Sir James Low, 1st Baronet (1849–1923)
Sir Walter John Morrison-Low, 2nd Baronet (1899–1955)
Sir James Richard Morrison-Low, 3rd Baronet (1925–2012)
Sir Richard Walter Morrison-Low, 4th Baronet (born 1959)

References
Kidd, Charles, Williamson, David (editors). Debrett's Peerage and Baronetage (1990 edition). New York: St Martin's Press, 1990.

Morrison-Low